The 1968–69 Washington State Cougars men's basketball team represented Washington State University for the 1968–69 NCAA college basketball season. Led by eleventh-year head coach Marv Harshman, the Cougars were members of the Pacific-8 Conference and played their home games on campus at Bohler Gymnasium in Pullman, Washington.

and the best since 1941.

References

External links
Sports Reference – Washington State Cougars: 1968–69 basketball season

Washington State Cougars men's basketball seasons
Washington State Cougars
Washington State
Washington State